The 2021 Men's Rugby League World Cup qualification was the qualifying process which will decide the 8 teams that would join the 8 quarter-finalists from the 2021 World Cup including the hosts England, who received an automatic spot, at the 2021 Rugby League World Cup. The process commenced in June 2018, with the commencement of the 2018–19 Rugby League European Championship C tournament, which acted as the first round for European qualification.

Background
In October 2016, England was announced as the host the tournament, granting them automatic qualification.

In March 2017, the RLIF confirmed that the 8 quarter-finalists from the 2017 World Cup would receive automatic qualification to the 2021 tournament, along with details of how many slots each region will be allocated: "Seven teams will be qualified from Europe, six from the Asia-Pacific, two from the Americas, and one from a play-off series hosted in Middle East/Africa." Because Lebanon gained automatic qualification, a repechage play-off between the 2nd placed Middle East/Africa team (behind Lebanon), 2nd placed Americas team (behind the Americas qualifying team), and the 7th placed Asia-Pacific team (behind the 6 auto qualifiers) will take place instead of qualifying 2 Americas teams.

The RLIF requires participating nations to hold full or affiliate level membership. The Netherlands are the only such nation that opted to not participate.

Qualified teams

Europe
 were the only European team to have been guaranteed qualification as they are hosting the tournament. With the World Cup expanding to 16 teams in 2021, one extra European slot was available in comparison to the 2017 tournament. 

The qualification structure is as follows:
First round: 4 teams, who are the top-ranked teams in Europe excluding , play in round-robin matches for the 2018 European Championship. The winners and runners-up qualify for the World Cup, with third and fourth place advancing to the third round.
Second round: 6 teams divided into two pools of three teams play round-robin matches with the winners and runners-up of each pool qualifying for the World Cup.

First round

The 2018 European Championship acted as the second round of European qualification for the 2021 World Cup and automatically qualified 2 teams to the World Cup; France and Wales. The bottom two nations; Ireland and Scotland, became the top seeds in the third round.

Second round

The third round of European qualification allowed four of the six teams to advance to the World Cup. The six teams were split into two round-robin pools. The winners and runner-up in each pool qualified for the 2021 World Cup. There was no European qualification to the intercontinental play-off. The qualifiers were Ireland and Italy from Pool A and Scotland and Greece from Pool B.

Pool A

Pool B

Americas

The Americas group comprised four teams and was played as a single elimination knock-out tournament.  won the group beating  in the first round and then  in the final.  qualified for the intercontinental play-off by finishing as the runner-up of the tournament.

Inter-regional Repechage

The intercontinental play-off consisted of the Americas championship runner up (United States), 7th highest ranked Asia-Pacific team (Cook Islands), and the 2nd highest ranked Middle East-Africa team (South Africa). Cook Islands played South Africa in a preliminary match, which Cook Islands won. They then defeated the United States in the final play-off match, clinching the final place at the World Cup.

Notes

References

2021 Rugby League World Cup
2018 in rugby league
2019 in rugby league